is an action role-playing game for the PlayStation. The game was the first 3D title developed by Shade, a development team within Quintet led by graphic designer Kouji Yokota. It is an intended spiritual successor to their previous Super NES titles, Soul Blazer and Terranigma (involving Tomoyoshi Miyazaki and Masanori Hikichi). The game was first published in Japan by Sony Computer Entertainment, then given a United States release by THQ.

The Granstream Saga is lauded as one of the first fully polygonal RPGs, as opposed to using polygonal characters with pre-rendered backgrounds, polygonal environments with scaling sprites, or other such combinations. The game features anime-style cutscenes by Production I.G. It is also somewhat unusual in that the characters the player meets in the game are faceless.

Gameplay
Gameplay consists of top-down RPG exploration and storytelling. When the player character is confronted or ambushed by an enemy, the camera angle shifts to a 45 degree angle, and combat begins. Combat consists of real-time one-on-one battles. In real-time combat, the player utilizes several weapons and abilities, such as swords, daggers, axes, warhammers, and various spells. When not in combat, they spend a very large time exploring, gaining new weapons and armor, and conversing with the many characters of the different continents.

Plot
The game takes place after a short animated sequence where Eon and Valos cut a section of land off of Shilf. After discovering a young boy has disappeared, Valos performs locating magic to find the boy in an ancient cemetery. The spirit of the Wise Man speaks to Eon here, and asks him to find and help his daughter, Arcia, to use the Orb and recite the lifting verse to raise the land. Together they make it a goal to raise the other continents as well, and set off on a journey.

Reception

Upon release, GamePro scored it 5 out of 5, stating it is "one of the most enjoyable new role-playing games of the year", praising its intriguing storyline, enemies, and frantic fighting action. They considered the "voice-overs during most of the cut scenes" as "audio highlights" and concluded its blend of "classic RPG elements (puzzle solving, spells, saving mankind) with those of the action/fighter genre" make it a fun and challenging adventure.

Next Generation reviewed the PlayStation version of the game, rating it two stars out of five. They considered the game as average and inferior to other titles like Final Fantasy, Konami's Suikoden, or Capcom's Breath of Fire.

The game holds an average score of 66% at GameRankings, based on an aggregate of 9 reviews. Hardcore Gaming 101 gave it a positive retrospective review, commenting its combat system, story and presentation.

References

External links
 

1997 video games
Action role-playing video games
PlayStation (console) games
PlayStation (console)-only games
Production I.G
Quintet (company) games
Role-playing video games
Sony Interactive Entertainment games
THQ games
Video games developed in Japan
Video games scored by Miyoko Takaoka
Single-player video games